The Farmers Bank of Petersburg is a historic building in Petersburg, Kentucky; it was added to the National Register of Historic Places on February 6, 1989.  The building is an excellent example of vernacular commercial architecture of the early 20th century (1900–1930).

Farmers Bank of Petersburg was founded in 1903 and closed in 1970. It was the fourth bank organized in Boone County, after Burlington, Walton, and Hebron, and was the only bank serving the western portion of Boone County.

Architectural details 
The boomtown facade indicates commercial use of the one-story gable-front building. The upper portion of the facade rests on a stone string course.   Lintels and sills are made of smooth cut stone and the facade parapet is capped with tin.

Gallery

References 

National Register of Historic Places in Boone County, Kentucky
Bank buildings on the National Register of Historic Places in Kentucky
1903 establishments in Kentucky
1970 disestablishments in Kentucky
Commercial buildings completed in 1903